Ihala Hanwella South Grama Niladhari Division is a Grama Niladhari Division of the Seethawaka Divisional Secretariat of Colombo District of Western Province, Sri Lanka. It has Grama Niladhari Division Code 443C.

Niripola are located within, nearby or associated with Ihala Hanwella South.

Ihala Hanwella South is a surrounded by the Diddeniya North, Hanwella Town, Ihala Hanwella North, Thunnana East, Koodaluvila and Pahathgama Grama Niladhari Divisions.

Demographics

Ethnicity 
The Ihala Hanwella South Grama Niladhari Division has a Sinhalese majority (97.8%). In comparison, the Seethawaka Divisional Secretariat (which contains the Ihala Hanwella South Grama Niladhari Division) has a Sinhalese majority (88.2%)

Religion 
The Ihala Hanwella South Grama Niladhari Division has a Buddhist majority (90.6%). In comparison, the Seethawaka Divisional Secretariat (which contains the Ihala Hanwella South Grama Niladhari Division) has a Buddhist majority (81.5%)

References 

Grama Niladhari Divisions of Seethawaka Divisional Secretariat